Grants Pass School District (#7) is a public school district that serves the city of Grants Pass, Oregon, United States.  As of 2018, it has an enrollment of 5,800 students.

Demographics
In the 2009 school year, the district had 115 students classified as homeless by the Department of Education, or 2.0% of students in the district.

School Board
Richard Ward (Position #1)
Cliff Kuhlman (Position #2)
Gary Richardson (Position #3)
Debbie Brownell (Position #4)
Barbara Satterthwaite (Position #5)
Garry Penning (Position #6)
Kathy Luther (Position #7)

Schools
High school
Grants Pass High School
Gladiola Campus
Middle schools
North Middle School
South Middle School

Elementary schools
Allen Dale Elementary School
Highland Elementary School
Lincoln Elementary School
Parkside Elementary School
Redwood Elementary School
Riverside Elementary School

See also
Three Rivers School District

References

External links
Grants Pass School District (official website)

School districts in Oregon
Education in Josephine County, Oregon
Grants Pass, Oregon